Twilight is a three-issue prestige format miniseries by Howard Chaykin and José Luis García-López published in 1990 by DC Comics.

Plot
Twilight attempted to bring in all of DC's future science/space characters, many originally from the 1950s and 1960s, into one series (despite the fact that many occurred in different time periods). It was another radical revamp of DC characters, including Tommy Tomorrow, the Star Rovers, Star Hawkins, Manhunter 2070 and Space Cabbie. Tommy Tomorrow is presented as an unbalanced individual who ran the Planeteers very autocratically, using them against his enemies, such as their rivals, the Knights of the Galaxy.

See also
Twilight of the Superheroes, a proposal by Alan Moore which is sometimes referred to as Twilight.  Like Chaykin's series, it crosses over many DC characters (though not specifically science/space characters) and presents many of them as unbalanced or debased.

References

1990 comics debuts
Comics by Howard Chaykin